Spathocera is a genus of European bugs in the family Coreidae, tribe Coreini. It includes "Dalman's leatherbug", S. dalmanii, which is fairly widely distributed, including southern England.

Species
Fauna Europaea lists the following:
 Spathocera dalmanii
 Spathocera laticornis
 Spathocera lobata
 Spathocera obscura
 Spathocera stali
 Spathocera tenuicornis
 Spathocera tuberculate

References

External links

Coreoidea Species File
britishbugs.org.uk

Hemiptera of Europe
Coreini
Coreidae genera